Peyton Minor Pallette (born May 9, 2001) is an American professional baseball pitcher in the Chicago White Sox organization.

Amateur career
Pallette attended Benton High School in Benton, Arkansas. He went unselected in the 2019 Major League Baseball draft out of high school and enrolled at the University of Arkansas to play college baseball. 

As a freshman at Arkansas in 2020, Pallette made four relief appearances before the season was cancelled due to the COVID-19 pandemic. That summer, he played in the California Collegiate League for the Santa Barbara Foresters, where he was a part of a combined no-hitter. In 2021, he moved in to the starting rotation. He was pulled in the middle of a game in mid-May with arm pain and missed the remainder of the season. Over 15 games (11 starts), Pallette went 1-2 with a 4.02 ERA and 67 strikeouts over 56 innings. He was slated to play in Cape Cod Baseball League but did not make an appearance due to his injury. Pallette returned to in-game action with the Razorbacks during their 2021 fall camp. Pallette entered the 2022 season as a top prospect for the upcoming draft. However, prior to the start of the season, it was announced that Pallette would undergo Tommy John surgery, forcing him to miss all of the 2022 season.

Professional career
Pallette was selected by the Chicago White Sox in the second round with the 62nd overall pick of the 2022 Major League Baseball draft. He signed with the team for $1.50 million.

References

External links
Arkansas Razorbacks bio

2001 births
Living people
Baseball players from Arkansas
Baseball pitchers
Arkansas Razorbacks baseball players